Qeydli Bolagh (also Romanized as Qeydlī Bolāgh and Qaydlī Bolāgh; also known as Qal‘eh Bulāq and Qeydī Bolāgh) is a village in Deymkaran Rural District, Salehabad District, Bahar County, Hamadan Province, Iran. At the 2006 census, its population was 304, in 73 families.

References 

Populated places in Bahar County